Thakurgaon-1 is a constituency represented in the Jatiya Sangsad (National Parliament) of Bangladesh. Ramesh Chandra Sen is the current member of parliament.

Boundaries 
The constituency encompasses Thakurgaon Sadar Upazila.

History 
The constituency was created in 1984 when the former Dinajpur District was split into three districts: Panchagarh, Thakurgaon, and Dinajpur.

Members of Parliament

Elections

Elections in the 2000s

Elections in the 1990s

References

External links
 

Parliamentary constituencies in Bangladesh
Thakurgaon District